In physics, the Callan–Symanzik equation is a differential equation describing the evolution of the n-point correlation functions under variation of the energy scale at which the theory is defined and involves the beta function of the theory and the anomalous dimensions.

In the process of renormalisation, a mass scale M must be chosen. Depending on M, the field strength is rescaled by a constant: , and as a result the bare coupling constant  is correspondingly shifted to the renormalised coupling constant g.

Of physical importance are the renormalised n-point functions, computed from connected Feynman diagrams, schematically of the form

The Callan–Symanzik equation relates these shifts:

After the following definitions

the Callan–Symanzik equation can be put in the conventional form:

 being the beta function.

In quantum electrodynamics this equation takes the form

where n and m are the numbers of electron and photon fields, respectively, for which the correlation function  is defined. The renormalised coupling constant is now the renormalised elementary charge e.

The Callan–Symanzik equation was discovered independently by Curtis Callan and Kurt Symanzik in 1970. Later it was used to understand asymptotic freedom.

This equation arises in the framework of renormalization group. It is possible to treat the equation using perturbation theory.

See also
Exact renormalization group equation
Beta function

Notes

References
 Jean Zinn-Justin, Quantum Field Theory and Critical Phenomena , Oxford University Press, 2003, 
 John Clements Collins, Renormalization, Cambridge University Press, 1986, 
 Michael E. Peskin and Daniel V. Schroeder, An Introduction to Quantum Field Theory, Addison-Wesley, Reading, 1995. 

Renormalization group
Equations